The discography of American rock band the Red Jumpsuit Apparatus consists of five studio albums, five extended plays, eighteen singles, and thirteen music videos.

Albums

Studio albums

Demos

Extended plays

Singles

Guest appearances

Music videos

Notes

References

External links
 
 
 

Discographies of American artists
Rock music group discographies